West Philadelphia Borough, also known as West Philadelphia District, is a defunct borough that was located west of the Schuylkill River in Blockley Township, Philadelphia County, Pennsylvania. The borough ceased to exist and was incorporated into the City of Philadelphia following the passage of the Act of Consolidation, 1854.

History
The borough was created on February 17, 1844, incorporating the villages of Hamilton and Mantua and their surrounding area. The borough became a district on April 3, 1853, and along with the new title came a larger area.

Resources
Chronology of the Political Subdivisions of the County of Philadelphia, 1683-1854
Information courtesy of ushistory.org
Incorporated District, Boroughs, and Townships in the County of Philadelphia, 1854 By Rudolph J. Walther - excerpted from the book at the ushistory.org website

Municipalities in Philadelphia County prior to the Act of Consolidation, 1854
1844 establishments in Pennsylvania
1854 disestablishments in Pennsylvania
Geography of Philadelphia
Populated places established in 1844
History of Philadelphia